A number of steamships have carried the name Pickhuben.

, a passenger ship in service with Hansa Line 1890–1917
, a cargo ship in service with H M Gehrckens 1923–45

Ship names